Ponatinib (trade name Iclusig  , previously AP24534) is an oral drug developed by ARIAD Pharmaceuticals for the treatment of chronic myeloid leukemia (CML) and Philadelphia chromosome–positive (Ph+) acute lymphoblastic leukemia (ALL).  It is a multi-targeted tyrosine-kinase inhibitor.  Some forms of CML, those that have the T315I mutation, are resistant to current therapies such as imatinib.  Ponatinib has been designed to be effective against these types of tumors.

The United States Food and Drug Administration approved the drug as a candidate in December 2012, but temporarily suspended sales on 31 October 2013 because of "the risk of life-threatening blood clots and severe narrowing of blood vessels". This suspension was partially lifted on Dec. 20, 2013 with ponatinib being issued revised prescribing information, a new "Black Box Warning" and a "Risk Evaluation and Mitigation Strategy" in place to better evaluate the risks and benefits of using the drug.

In the US it can cost $138,000 a year, which has been criticized.

Approvals and indications 
Ponatinib was approved by the US FDA on December 14, 2012, for patients with resistant or intolerant CML and Ph+ ALL, based on results of the PACE phase II trial reported days earlier at the annual ASH meeting. Because the approval was under the FDA Accelerated Approval program the applicant was required to carry out additional studies. Based on these additional studies, the FDA granted in 2016 full approval and updated the label to include patients with chronic phase, accelerated phase, or blast phase chronic myeloid leukemia and Philadelphia chromosome-positive acute lymphoblastic leukemia for whom no other tyrosine kinase inhibitor therapy is indicated. Approval was also granted for T315I-positive and T315I-positive Philadelphia chromosome positive acute lymphoblastic leukemia.

Adverse effects 
The United States Food and Drug Administration issued a partial clinical hold on new trial enrollment for ponatinib on October 9, 2013, due to an increased number of blood clots observed in patients taking the drug. The EPIC trial was later canceled on October 18. Subsequent studies of 449 patients treated during 4 years with ponatinib for chronic phase chronic myelogenous leukemia found the following adverse reactions. 150 Patients experienced cardiac vascular (21% of patients), peripheral vascular (12%), and cerebrovascular (9%) arterial occlusive events. Venous thromboembolic events occurred in 6% of patients. The most common all-grade adverse events included hypertension (69%), rash (63%), abdominal pain (48%), fatigue (47%), headache (43%), arterial ischemia (42%), dry skin (42%), constipation (41%), arthralgia (32%), nausea (28%), pyrexia (26%), peripheral neuropathy (24%), myalgia (24%), pain in extremity (23%), back pain (21%), and diarrhea (20%). In addition, there have been reported cases of the posterior reversible encephalopathy syndrome. Recently, an analogue of ponatinib was developed that retained anti-tumor efficacy but had reduced cardiovascular toxicity in experimental models.

Clinical trials 
In 2010 ARIAD announced result from a Phase I study of ponatinib in patients with resistant and refractory chronic myeloid leukemia (CML) and Philadelphia-positive acute lymphoblastic leukemia (Ph+ ALL). The study demonstrated that in chronic-phase CML patients treated with ponatinib, 66 percent of patients in the trial achieved a major cytogenetic response, including 100 percent of patients who also had a T315I mutation.

The PACE (Ponatinib Ph+ ALL and CML Evaluation) pivotal phase II trial started enrolling patients in September 2010 and is designed to provide definitive clinical data for regulatory approval in this setting.  Good results were reported in December 2012.

The EPIC (Evaluation of Ponatinib versus Imatinib in CML) phase-III trial began in June 2012  and was halted on October 18, 2013.

Mechanism of action 
The primary target for ponatinib is BCR-ABL, an abnormal tyrosine kinase that is the hallmark of CML and Ph+ ALL. CML is characterized by an excessive and unregulated production of white blood cells by the bone marrow due to a genetic abnormality that produces the BCR-ABL protein. After a chronic phase of production of too many white blood cells, CML typically evolves to more aggressive phases such as accelerated or blast crisis. Ph+ ALL is a subtype of acute lymphoblastic leukemia that carries the Ph+ chromosome that produces BCR-ABL. It has a more aggressive course than CML and is often treated with a combination of chemotherapy and tyrosine kinase inhibitors. Because both of these diseases express the BCR-ABL protein, this would render them potentially susceptible to treatment with ponatinib. BCR-ABL is detected in 95% of patients with CML.

Patients with CML currently receive front line therapies nilotinib and/or dasatinib though 22−33% of patients discontinue therapy by two years due to adverse events, treatment failure and other causes.

Discovery and origin 
Ponatinib was designed using ARIAD's computational and structure-based drug design platform to inhibit the enzymatic activity of BCR-ABL with very high potency and broad specificity. Ponatinib was intended to target not only native BCR-ABL, but also its isoforms that carry mutations that confer resistance to treatment with existing tyrosine kinase inhibitors, including especially the T315I mutation for which no effective therapy exists.

The road to discovery is linked to AP23464, one of the first of Ariad's ATP competitive dual Src/Abl inhibitors. AP23464 was identified using structure base drug design and focused synthetic libraries of trisubstituted purine analogs.  The substance potently inhibits Src and Bcr-Abl kinases including many common imatinib-resistant Bcr-Abl mutations. AP23464 does not inhibit the T315I mutation, however, whereas ponatinib does.

Cost, coverage and availability 
[US] Oncologists have complained that many patients cannot afford the "astronomical" cost of $138,000 a year, which makes it one of the most expensive drugs in medicine, and [in their view] far more expensive than what is needed to pay the development costs.

In 2015 ponatinib is available in England for the treatment of CML (chronic phase, accelerated phase or blast phase) and Ph+ ALL in patients with documented T315I mutation under the Cancer Drugs Fund, and has not been appraised by the National Institute for Health and Care Excellence (NICE), who noted the small expected patient population. NICE estimated that ponatinib would cost approximately £61,000 per year, but the price paid under the Cancer Drugs Fund is confidential and may be different.

See also 
 Bcr-Abl tyrosine-kinase inhibitor, especially the sections on Ponatinib development
 and binding

References

External links 
 

Alkyne derivatives
Non-receptor tyrosine kinase inhibitors
Trifluoromethyl compounds
Piperazines
Takeda Pharmaceutical Company brands